The Bosnia and Herzegovina national handball team represents Bosnia and Herzegovina in international handball matches.

Championship record

World Championship

European Championship

Team

Current squad

Coaching history
Senad Fetahagić (21 June 1993 – 1999)
Sead Hasanefendić (2 June 2000 – 24 September 2002)
Abaz Arslanagić (24 September 2002 – 23 October 2003)
Jasmin Mrkonja (23 October 2003 – 2 July 2004)
Kasim Kamenica (2 July 2004 – 9 November 2005)
Vojislav Rađa (9 November 2005 – 20 April 2006)
Halid Demirović (6 October 2006 – 31 August 2009)
Vojislav Rađa (8 September 2009 – 21 June 2011)
Dragan Marković (26 October 2011 – 16 June 2016)
Bilal Šuman (20 August 2016 – 17 February 2021)
Ivica Obrvan (17 February 2021 – January 2022)
Irfan Smajlagić (1 October 2022 – present)

Player statistics

Most appearances

Top scorers

Kit

References

External links

IHF profile

Handball in Bosnia and Herzegovina
Men's national handball teams
handball